Sara Leighton (born 1937) is an English society portrait painter, author, actress and personality, also noted for her beauty.

Life and work
Sara Leighton was born as Shirley Lorimer in London in 1937, the sister of actress Carole Lorimer. Her ambition was to become a painter since she was old enough to hold a brush, and this she pursued under the tutelage of Pietro Annigoni. She stated that 'Annigoni gave me the heart to fight for a career when the cards of my sex, youth and country of origin were neatly stacked against me... he was a strict disciplinarian.' In her youth she acted in numerous TV and film roles under both her birth name, Shirley Lorimer and her assumed name Sara Leighton.

Leighton quickly found considerable success in portrait painting, becoming highly sought after by rich and influential society figures who were eager for her to paint their likeness. One of her most famous commissions was the Queen Mother. Leighton stated that she was also her favourite subject 'something goes on when she enters a room... the Queen Mother is genuinely so kind and has a way of making you feel you are the important one, not her.' Helen Cathcart, the Queen Mother's biographer noted that 'preparing a fresco, a younger artist, Sara Leighton, preferred to eschew formal sittings and was permitted to follow the Queen Mother with a sketchbook,' One of these sketches was later made into a popular limited edition print, published by the House of Questa, London in an edition of 2,500.

1963 saw Leighton establishing the company London Portrait's LTD in order to administer the increasing demand for her work. The following year, Leighton was badly injured in a car accident near Tunbridge Wells, receiving facial injuries and leg fractures. Also involved in the accident was Keith Waters her husband, and the famous American female bullfighter Sandra Landry who had flown to England to have her portrait painted by Leighton.

In November, 1971 it was reported in the Toledo Blade that Muhammad Ali was to have his portrait painted by Sara Leighton, however according to the Boca Raton News in October 1981, Leighton declined his request as well as that of Elizabeth Taylor. She justified the reasons for her decision, stating 'when I paint I must have total concentration. Although they would make lovely subjects, I can not paint in a three-ring circus. There was too much activity around them at the time I was propositioned to paint.'

In 1972, she travelled to South America in search of the Jaguar, the resulting painting being donated to the Royal Society for the Prevention of Cruelty to Animals. The painting Storm over the Veldt was donated to the Worldlife Fund on its 10th Anniversary, with the proceeds from reproduction rights going to the fund.

In the mid-1970s she lived in Bahrain, taking a flat in the National Bank of Bahrain Building, Manama, overlooking the then dhow harbour.

Leighton was also controversially outspoken in regards to her sex, rejecting the rising feminist discourse prevalent at the time. In 1962 at the age of 26, she founded (perhaps satirically) The Society for the Protection of Utter Femininity. The society's aims were to encourage women to give up the vote and stop trying to compete with men in business - she quipped to the press, 'A woman should stay in the home...my ex-husband agrees with me.' She later stated that "Chopin was right when he said that all creative energy is sexual. He was writing a letter and he said something like: 'and when I think my darling, of how many sonatas I have poured into you.' That's why I don't think there have been great women painters."

Sara Leighton was also famed for her beauty, Pietro Annigoni once labelled her 'the most beautiful woman in the world'. The British newsreader Jan Leeming recalled 'I thought salvation, or an answer to my dilemma would come in the shape of a job in the north of England. I'd been to an audition for a news reading position with Granada Television in Manchester. I vividly remember walking into a room where other hopefuls were sitting. My heart sank when I looked at one stunningly beautiful woman and thought I hadn't got a chance. She was a painter called Sara Leighton, who went on to relative acclaim. To my surprise, she didn't get the job, I did. I can only think it was because I already had experience of news reading and the others hadn't.'

In 1973 it was reported that Sara Leighton had bought a 40-room monastery in Tuscany, Italy, and intended to turn it into a sanctuary for writers, musicians, artists, as paying guests.

Leighton increasing became a media personality, appearing regularly on talk and panel shows including Parkinson, which brought with it her fair share of press attention. In 1975 1980 saw Leighton publish her autobiography titled Of Savages and Kings, which recounts her adventures around the world with the diverse and interesting people that were part of her exciting life. She recalls her encounters with many of her clients and friends including Lord Olivier, The Prince of Wales, Muhammad Ali, Sheikh Yamani, Gloria Swanson, Pietro Annigoni, Sir Roger Moore, Jean Rook, David Niven, Shirley Bassey, Joan Collins, Queen Elizabeth The Queen Mother, The Princess Royal and the Beaverbrook family.

Sara Leighton's work is scarce, owing to the majority being commissioned portraits still in the possession of the patrons. In November 2005, Female clown on trapeze - a pencil and watercolour drawing - and one of the few works to appear on the market, sold at Christie's, King Street London for £384.

Exhibitions
 1979 - Dreamscapes and Paintings - The Medici Gallery, London
 1981 - Sara Leighton: Dreamscapes - Patricia Judith Art Gallery, Boca Raton USA
 1987 - Sara Leighton: Eternal Beauty - Patricia Judith Art Gallery, Boca Raton USA
 1988 - Sara Leighton: Dreamscapes - The Mensing Gallery, Germany
 1996 - Sara Leighton: Exhibition of Paintings, Heals, London
 2015 - Sara Leighton: Dreams and Reflections, the A@D Gallery, London

Books
(illustrated by Sara Leighton)
Hayes, Walter. Angelica: The Bewitching Witch (1968)

(written by Sara Leighton)
Leighton, Sara. Of Savages and Kings (Bachman and Turner, 1980)

(Written and illustrated by Sara Leighton)The Naughty Greedy Pandamoth ( The Book Guild 2015 )

Film and television

(credited as Shirley Lorimer)You Know What Sailors Are (1954) - JasminUp to His Neck (1954) (uncredited) - FannyNo Place for Jennifer (1950) -Georgie BishopBrighton Rock (1947) (uncredited) - ShirleyAnne of Green Gables (1952) - Anne Shirley

(credited as Sara Leighton)The Woman Eater (1958)Dial 999 - (2 episodes, 1959)The Dickie Henderson Half-Hour (1 episode, 1958)

References

Other sources
They Call Me Psychic Sara, Prediction'' (February, 1959)

External links
 

1937 births
Living people
20th-century English women artists
21st-century English women artists
20th-century English painters
21st-century English painters
English women painters
English portrait painters
Landscape artists
Painters from London